Live from Across the Pond is a live blues album by Robert Cray. It was released on September 12, 2006, through Vanguard Records. It is his first live album release.

Disc one
"Phone Booth" (Dennis Walker, Mike Vannice, Richard Cousins, Cray) - 4:38
"Poor Johnny" (Cray) - 6:22
"Our Last Time" (Jimmy Pugh, John Hanes) - 8:23
"Right Next Door (Because of Me)" (Dennis Walker) - 6:01
"12 Year Old Boy" (Mel London) - 6:27
"I Guess I Showed Her" (Dennis Walker) - 4:40
"The Things You Do To Me" (Cray) - 7:02

Disc two
"I Was Warned" (Cray, Dennis Walker) - 8:36
"Twenty" (Cray) - 7:34
"Bad Influence" (Cray, Mike Vannice) - 3:58
"The One in the Middle" (Jimmy Pugh) - 8:19
"Back Door Slam" (Bonnie Hayes, Kevin Hayes) - 5:26
"Time Makes Two" (Cray) - 6:18
"I'm Walkin'" (Chris Hayes, Kevin Hayes) - 5:23

Personnel
Robert Cray Band
Robert Cray - Guitar, Vocals
Jim Pugh - Keyboard
Kevin Hayes - Drums
Karl Sevareid - Bass

References

Robert Cray albums
2006 live albums
Live blues albums
Vanguard Records live albums
Live albums recorded at the Royal Albert Hall